Gudaghe (गुडघे) is a small village in Dapoli Taluka of Ratnagiri District, Maharashtra state in Western India. The 2011 Census of India recorded a total of 687 residents in the village.

Geography 
Gudaghe is a village which is located about 30.6 km from Dapoli. It has a consistent elevation from the coastal region to the hilly region. As part of the Western Ghats, the forests are evergreen, consisting mainly of tropical forest. Alphonso mangos, cashew Nuts, jack fruit & coconuts are grown commercially in this area. The place is subjected to different kind of weathers all around the year and so the flora and fauna are affected accordingly.

Main Spoken language is Marathi and most of the people belong to a single large family.

Major followed religion is Hinduism.

Education 
The village has a very old school named Zilla Parishad Primary Marathi School Gudaghe. Mostly Students travel to Dapoli, Khed, Ratnagiri, Mumbai and Pune for Higher Education.

Sports 
Cricket is a very popular game in the village of Gudaghe. In addition, Kho-Kho and Kabaddi are also played in sports especially at school level.

References

External links 

Villages in Ratnagiri district